Submarines of World War II represented a wide range of capabilities with many types of varying specifications produced by dozens of countries.  The principle countries engaged in submarine warfare during the war were Germany, Italy, Japan, the United States, United Kingdom and the Soviet Union.  The Italian and Soviet fleets were the largest. While the German and US fleets fought anti-shipping campaigns (in the Atlantic and Pacific respectively), the British and Japanese submarines were mostly engaged against enemy warships.

Specifications

Notes
Notes

Citations

References
 Bishop, C., The Encyclopedia of Weapons of World War II, Metro Books, 1998, 
 Croix, P., The Encyclopedia of the World’s Warships p. 184, Chartwell Books, 1985, 
 Bagnasco, E. Submarines of World War Two, Naval Institute Press, 1978, 
 Friedman, N., U.S. Submarines Through 1945, Naval Institute Press, 1995, 
 Miller, D., Submarines of the World MBI Publishing, 2002, 

Spec
Submarines of France
Submarines of Germany
Submarines of Japan
Submarines of the United Kingdom
Submarines of the United States
Lists of submarines